The heptagonal bipyramid is one of the infinite set of bipyramids, dual to the infinite prisms. If an heptagonal bipyramid is to be face-transitive, all faces must be isosceles triangles. The resulting solid has 14 triangular faces, 9 vertices and 21 edges.

Related polyhedra

References

External links
 
Virtual Reality Polyhedra The Encyclopedia of Polyhedra
 VRML models <7>
Conway Notation for Polyhedra Try: dP7

Polyhedra